Tseng Hsiao-chia (born 21 June 1987) is a Taiwanese former road cyclist, who represented her nation at the 2011 UCI Road World Championships.

Major results

2004
 Asian Junior Road Championships
5th Road race
7th Time trial
2009
 7th Road race, East Asian Games
2011
 7th Time trial, Asian Road Championships
2014
 1st Individual pursuit, Taiwan Hsin-Chu Track International Classic
 Hong Kong International Track Cup
2nd Points race
2nd Scratch
3rd Individual pursuit
 Hong Kong International Track Cup
2nd Scratch
3rd Omnium
 3rd  Team pursuit, Asian Games (with Hsiao Mei-yu, Huang Ting-ying & Ju I Fang)
 3rd  Scratch, Asian Track Championships
 4th Time trial, Asian Road Championships
2015
 1st Omnium, Yangyang International Track Competition
 Taiwan Hsin-Chu Track International Classic
1st Individual pursuit
1st Scratch
3rd Omnium
 2nd Points race, Japan Track Cup
 5th Time trial, Asian Road Championships

References

External links

1987 births
Taiwanese female cyclists
Living people
Place of birth missing (living people)
Asian Games medalists in cycling
Cyclists at the 2010 Asian Games
Cyclists at the 2014 Asian Games
Medalists at the 2014 Asian Games
Asian Games bronze medalists for Chinese Taipei